Kremenchuk is an industrial city in central Ukraine which stands on the banks of the Dnieper River. The city serves as the administrative center of Kremenchuk Raion (district) in Poltava Oblast (province). Its population is approximately 

Although not as large as some other oblast centers, Kremenchuk has a large industrial center in Ukraine and Eastern Europe. A KrAZ truck plant, the Kremenchuk Oil Refinery of Ukrtatnafta, the Kriukiv Railway Car Building Works, and Kremenchuk Hydroelectric Power Plant, in nearby Svitlovodsk, are located in or near Kremenchuk. Highway M22 crosses the Dnieper over the dam of the power plant.

The Kriukiv Railway Car Building Works is one of the oldest railway-repair and rail-car-building factories in Eastern Europe, dating from 1869.

Kremenchuk's Ukrtatnafta oil refinery is the largest in Ukraine and for a while was the only one operating since the beginning of the conflict with Russia that left refineries in the Donbas inactive. Because of Russian attacks during the 2022 Russian invasion of Ukraine, the refinery is expected to be out of operation for the remainder of 2022.

History
Kremenchuk was founded in 1571 as a fortress. The name Kremenchuk is explained as deriving from the word "kremen" - flint (a mineral) because the city is located on a giant chert plate. An alternative explanation says that "Kremenchuk" is the Turkish for "small fortress".

In 1625, at Lake Kurukove in Kremenchuk, the Treaty of Kurukove was signed between Cossacks and the Poles. Since the establishment of the Cossack Hetmanate, the city was part of the Chyhyryn Polk (regiment). Following the Russo-Polish War (1654–1667) and Treaty of Andrusovo, the city was secured by the Tsardom of Russia and became part of the Myrhorod Polk (regiment) within the left-bank of the Cossack Hetmanate. The city played a key role in the Russian colonization policy of Ukraine and their striving for the shores of Black Seas as regional administrative center of the early Novorossiya Governorate and Yekaterinoslav Vice-regency (Namestnichestvo). With the creation of Novorossiya Governorate, the Dnieper Pikemen Regiment was created and coincidentally a few years later (1768–69) in the neighboring regions of Poland began the Koliyivshchyna. Here in 1786 the Russian general Alexander Suvorov started his military career when he was appointed a commander of the local garrison (in preparation of the 1787–1792 Russo-Turkish War).

Following defeat in the Crimean War began the installation of a network of railroads in Russia, and in 1869 in Kryukiv were built small railcar repair shops, while in 1872 the city of Kriukiv was connected with Kremenchuk by a railroad bridge over the Dnieper. In 1870 in Kremenchuk a factory was built that produced and maintained agrarian equipment and iron cast products. In 1899 a network of tramway transportation was introduced in Kremenchuk that existed until the complete establishment of Soviet regime in Ukraine in 1921.

During the Russian February Revolution of 1917, power in the city was controlled by a council (soviet) of workers' deputies which was dominated by the Russian Social Democratic Labour Party and the head of the city council was the future Ukrainian Communist leader Yuriy Lapchynskyi. During the Ukrainian–Soviet War, on 26 January 1918, Russian Bolshevik troops secured the city, however already in February of the same year they had to withdraw due to the treaty of Brest-Litovsk and advance of German and Ukrainian armies. Following the World War I hostilities between the Bolshevik Russia and Ukraine renewed and on 1 February 1919 the Russian Red Army once again secured the city. However, in May of the same year Kremechuk was engulfed in the insurgency of Otaman Grigoriev who earlier sided with Bolsheviks and drove the international force of Triple Entante from Odessa. From July to December 1919 the city was occupied by the Russian "White Guard" troops of Anton Denikin. Following their withdrawal, the Denikin's troops blew up the railroad bridge.

In 1920–1922, the city was the administrative center of the short-lived Kremenchuk Governorate during a peasant insurgency (Kholodnyi Yar) near Chyhyryn (just west of the city). During the 1930s, Kremenchuk's industry was transformed, its Kriukiv railcar repair shops became a railcar manufacturing factory, while its factory in production of agrarian equipment changed to manufacturing road equipment.

During World War II (1939-1945), Kremenchuk suffered heavily under Nazi occupation. It was occupied from September 15, 1941, to September 29, 1943. More than 90% of the city's buildings were leveled over the course of the war. 29 September, the day when the city was liberated from the Nazis in 1943, is celebrated in Kremenchuk as City Day. Despite a remarkable post-war recovery and a healthier economy, Kremenchuk lacks much of the architectural charm and distinctly Ukrainian (rather than Russian) character of its sister city, the oblast capital of Poltava.

During the Cold War, Kremenchuk became the headquarters for the 43rd Rocket Division of the 43rd Army of the Soviet Strategic Rocket Forces. The division was equipped with R-12 Dvina intercontinental ballistic missiles.

In 1975 the city of Kryukiv was merged with Kremenchuk, while Kremenchuk was divided in two raions in city.

In 2014 during the mass demolition of monuments to Vladimir Lenin in Ukraine, in the city were removed two monuments of the Russian Communist leader in the city center and near the Kryukiv Railcar Factory.

Oleh Babayev, the mayor of Kremenchuk was assassinated on July 26, 2014. Oleh Babayev opposed separatism and promoted national unity, prior to becoming mayor he was a member of the Batkivshchyna political party which opposed Victor Yanukovich. His political views and Kremenchuk's large industrial base may have been the motivation for the attack.

During the 2014 pro-Russian unrest in Ukraine security at the Kremenchuk Reservoir was heightened as it was seen as a possible target for saboteurs.

During the 2022 Russian invasion of Ukraine, Kremenchuk has been under attack by Russian forces.  On April 27 and May 12 an oil refinery was hit by Russian missiles and will be out of operation for months. On June 27  a shopping mall was hit by Russian missiles and caught fire, 16 people died and 59 were injured. Just after the strike, a nearby factory was hit. Russian authorities claimed that the factory hosted weapons supplied by the US and European countries. In 2014, the factory was known to repair armoured personnel carriers (BTR-70s).

Economy

Kremenchuk is the economic center of the Poltava Oblast and one of the leading industrial centers of Ukraine. , it contributed about 7 percent of the national economy and accounted for more than 50 percent of the industrial output in Poltava Oblast. The city is home to KrAZ, a truck-manufacturing company (one of the largest in Eastern Europe) as well as a major European oil refinery operated by Ukrtatnafta, the road-making machine works, Kremenchuk Automobile Assembly Plant, the Kryukivsky Car Manufacturing Plant, train railway rolling stock wagons, the wheel plant, the carbon black plant, the steel works and others.

The light industries of the city include tobacco (JTI), confectionery (Roshen), a knitting factory as well as milk and meat processing plants.

Kremenchuk is one of the most important railway junctions in Central Ukraine (thanks to its geographical position and a bridge over the River Dnipro) and a major river port on the main river of Ukraine.

Sport

Kremenchuk is home to HK Kremenchuk ice hockey team who compete in the Ukrainian Championship and FC Kremin Kremenchuk football team.

Beside FC Kremin, the city was also represented by number of other professional football clubs such as FC Adoms Kremenchuk, FC Naftokhimik Kremenchuk, and FC Vahonobudivnyk Kremenchuk.

The city has several sports schools, about six stadiums including Polytechnic Stadium (main city stadium), Kremin Stadium, and others, as well as couple of swimming pools and couple of athletic halls.

Gallery

Notable residents
Fedor Opanasovich Chaika, Great-grandfather of the composer Tchaikovsky
Alexander Pechersky, one of the leaders of Sobibor uprising
Emmanuel Mané-Katz, artist
Leo Ornstein, composer and pianist
Avraham Shlonsky, Israeli poet and editor
Dimitri Tiomkin, film composer 
Anton Makarenko, educator, social worker and writer.
Sergey Vashchenko, Balalaika virtuoso and conductor
Vyacheslav Senchenko, World welterweight boxing champion
Charles David Spivak, founder of the Jewish Consumptives' Relief Society
Yehoshua Hankin, Zionist pioneer

Twin towns – sister cities
Kremenchuk is twinned with:

 Svishtov, Bulgaria
 Wenzhou, China
 Bydgoszcz, Poland
 Berdiansk, Ukraine
 Bila Tserkva, Ukraine
 Kolomyia, Ukraine
 Jiayuguan, China
 Alytus, Lithuania
 Sidoarjo, Indonesia
 Michalovce, Slovakia
 Snina, Slovakia
 Providence, Rhode Island, United States
 Bitola, North Macedonia
 Rishon LeZion, Israel

See also
Kremenchuk University
Kremenchuk River Port
Kremenchuk Steel Works

References

External links

 Official homepage of Kremenchuk
 Today's photo of Kremenchuk
Soviet topographic map 1:100,000
The murder of the Jews of Kremenchuk during World War II, at Yad Vashem website.

 
Cities in Poltava Oblast
Kremenchugsky Uyezd
Cossack Hetmanate
Populated places established in 1571
Cities of regional significance in Ukraine
1571 establishments in the Polish–Lithuanian Commonwealth
Holocaust locations in Ukraine
Populated places on the Dnieper in Ukraine